USS Cochrane (DDG-21) was a  guided missile destroyer built for the United States Navy in the 1960s.

Design and description
The Charles F. Adams class was based on a stretched  hull modified to accommodate smaller RIM-24 Tartar surface-to-air missiles and all their associated equipment. They displaced  at full load. Their crew consisted of 18 officers and 320 enlisted men.

The ships were equipped with two geared steam turbines, each driving one propeller shaft, using steam provided by four water-tube boilers.

The Charles F. Adams-class ships were armed with two 5"/54 caliber Mark 42 gun forward, one each forward and aft of the superstructure. They were fitted with an eight-round ASROC launcher between the funnels. Close-range anti-submarine defense was provided by two triple sets of  Mk 32 torpedo tubes. The primary armament of the ships was the Tartar surface-to-air missile designed to defend the carrier battle group. They were fired via the Mk 13 missile launcher and the ships stowed a total of 40 missiles for the launcher.

Construction and career
Cochrane, named for Vice Admiral Edward L. Cochrane, USN, was laid down by the Puget Sound Bridge and Dredging Company at Seattle, Washington on 31 July 1961, launched on 18 July 1962 and commissioned on 21 March 1964. In April 1975 Cochrane participated in Operation Frequent Wind, the evacuation of Saigon, Vietnam.

Cochrane was decommissioned on 1 October 1990, struck from the Naval Vessel Register on 20 November 1992 and sold for scrap to International Shipbreaking, Incorporated, of Brownsville in Texas on 14 November 2000.

In Popular Culture

Cochrane appears in the original Hawaii Five-O (1968 TV series) season 8 episode Murder: Eyes Only.

Notes

References

External links

External links

DANFS page on USS Cochrane
MaritimeQuest USS Cochrane DDG-21 pages

 

Cold War destroyers of the United States
1962 ships
Charles F. Adams-class destroyers
Ships built by Lockheed Shipbuilding and Construction Company